Donia Maher (born 14 November 1979) is an Egyptian actress, writer and artist. She was born in Cairo. After studying acting, she appeared in several theatre and film productions, culminating with her breakthrough role in Hala Lotfy's film Al Khorug lel Nahar (2012) which was screened in film festivals around the world. She was also praised for her role in the TV series Segn El Nesa (Women’s Prison).

More recently, Maher has gained renown for her graphic novel The Apartment in Bab El-Louk, created in collaboration with the illustrators Ganzeer and Ahmad Nady. The English translation by Elisabeth Jaquette was nominated for the Banipal Prize.

Donia Maher lives in Cairo.

References

Egyptian film actresses
Egyptian writers
1979 births
Living people
Egyptian stage actresses
Actresses from Cairo
Date of birth missing (living people)
Egyptian women writers